Uptown Suburbs Historic District, also known as Johnson Place, Sheraton Hill, The Parkway, Roland Park, and Emerywood, is a  national historic district located at High Point, Guilford County, North Carolina. The district encompasses 759 contributing buildings, 2 contributing sites, and 12 contributing structures in a predominantly middle- to upper-class residential section of High Point.  They were built between 1903 and 1963 and include notable examples of Colonial Revival architecture, Tudor Revival architecture, and Bungalow / American Craftsman architecture.  Located in the district and listed separately are the Lucy and J. Vassie Wilson House, Dr. C. S. Grayson House, Hardee Apartments, J. C. Siceloff House, John H. Adams House, and A. E. Taplin Apartment Building.  Another notable building is the Sidney Halstead Tomlinson House (c. 1924).

It was listed on the National Register of Historic Places in 2013.

References

Buildings and structures in High Point, North Carolina
Historic districts on the National Register of Historic Places in North Carolina
Colonial Revival architecture in North Carolina
Tudor Revival architecture in North Carolina
National Register of Historic Places in Guilford County, North Carolina